Hong Kong Philharmonic Society may refer to:
the pre-war music society which organised various kind of music performances Hong Kong Philharmonic Society (1895-1941)
the Hong Kong Philharmonic Orchestra which is rooted from Sino-British Orchestra (1947-1957)